Tropidoturris scitecosta is a species of sea snail, a marine gastropod mollusk in the family Borsoniidae.

Description
The size of the shell attains 23.5 mm, its width 7 mm.
(Original description) The fusiform shell is acuminated at both ends. Its color is light brown without markings. The spire is acutely turreted. It contains 8 whorls. The apical ones are smooth rounded oblique. The rest are deeply and smoothly concave at the top, then slightly convex, furnished with numerous oblique rounded smooth close-set ribs, the ribs terminating in a well-defined angle at the top. The body whorl is about equal in length to the spire, slightly convex above and tapering below. It is spirally lirate towards the base and scarcely rostrate. The aperture is oblong, its interior smooth and, brown. The columella is rather straight . The outer lip is thin, arched, with a moderate posterior sinus situated close to the suture.

Distribution
This marine species occurs off Transkei, South Africa

References

 Kilburn R.N. (1986). Turridae (Mollusca: Gastropoda) of southern Africa and Mozambique. Part 3. Subfamily Borsoniinae. Annals of the Natal Museum. 27: 633–720.
 Rosenberg, G. 1992. Encyclopedia of Seashells. Dorset: New York. 224 pp.page(s): 104

External links

 

Endemic fauna of South Africa
scitecosta
Gastropods described in 1903